João Gonçalves Zarco ( 1390 – 21 November 1471) is an Portuguese explorer who established settlements and recognition of the Madeira Islands, and was appointed first captain of Funchal by Henry the Navigator.

Life

Zarco was born in Portugal, and became a knight at the service of Prince Henry the Navigator's household. In his service at an early age, Zarco commanded the caravels guarding the coast of the Algarve from Muslim incursions, was at the conquest of Ceuta, and later led the caravels that recognized the island of Porto Santo in 1418 to 1419 and afterward, the island of Madeira 1419 to 1420. He founded the city of Câmara de Lobos. He was granted, as hereditary leader (Capitania), half the island of Madeira (the Capitania of Funchal, being its first Captain-major). Together with his fellow fleet commanders, Tristão Vaz Teixeira and Bartolomeu Perestrelo, he initiated the colonization of the islands in 1425. As a knight of the House of Avis, he participated in the siege of Tangier, in 1437, which ended in failure. He died at Funchal, Madeira.

Ancestry and descendency
He married Constança Rodrigues, daughter of Rodrigo Lopes de Sequeiros (?) and wife, and had the following issue:
 João Gonçalves da Câmara (d. Funchal, Madeira, 26 March 1501), married to Dona Mécia de Noronha, daughter of Dom João Henriques de Noronha (bastard son of Alfonso, Count of Gijón and Noroña) and wife Beatriz, Lady de Mirabel and sister of Dom Garcia Henriques, and had issue, and also one bastard son by an unknown mother
 Rui Gonçalves da Câmara, 3rd Donatary Captain of São Miguel Island, married to Maria de Bettencourt, natural daughter of Maciot de Bettencourt by Teguise, without issue, he had a bastard son by one Maria Rodrigues and three more children by an unknown mother
 Garcia Rodrigues da Câmara, married to Violante de Freitas, and had issue
 Beatriz Gonçalves da Câmara, married to Diogo Cabral, and had issue
 Isabel Gonçalves da Câmara, married to Diogo Afonso de Aguiar, o Velho (the Old), and had issue
 Helena Gonçalves da Câmara, married to Martim Mendes de Vasconcelos, and had issue
 Catarina Gonçalves da Câmara, married to Garcia Homem de Sousa

Possible Jewish ancestry

There are discussions as to whether João Gonçalves Zarco could have been of Jewish Converso origin. Zarco was a prominent Jewish family from Santarém and Lisbon. Mossé Zarco was King João II's tailor. There was also a Portuguese doctor named Joseph Zarco, whom some authors claim to be Joseph Ibn Sharga, the great kabbalist, and a sixteenth-century poet named Yehuda Zarco. Augusto Mascarenhas Barreto suggested that Christopher Columbus could have been of Jewish descent from Portugal and his real name was Salvador Fernandes Zarco. Isabel Violante Pereira also attributes Jewish ancestry to João Gonçalves Zarco.

In culture
The novel of Arkan Simaan, L'Écuyer d'Henri le Navigateur (Harmattan, Paris, 2007), deals with Zarco's life.

Footnotes

References
António da Costa de Albuquerque de Sousa Lara, 2nd Count de Guedes, Vasco de Bettencourt de Faria Machado e Sampaio and Marcelo Olavo Correia de Azevedo, Ascendências Reais de Sua Alteza Real a Senhora Dona Isabel de Herédia Duquesa de Bragança, I, pelos Costados Herédia, Bettencourt e Meneses da Ilha da Madeira" (Universitária Editora, 1999)

External links
Zarco's statue on Madeira 

Portuguese explorers
History of Madeira
Maritime history of Portugal
15th-century explorers
Portuguese city founders
1390s births
1471 deaths
15th-century Portuguese people
14th-century Portuguese people
Donatary-Captains of Madeira
Gonçalves da Câmara family